Elias Salomon Nathan (17 May 1807 – 5 July 1862) was a German author and physician.

Biography
Elias Salomon Nathan was born in Eutin, Duchy of Oldenburg, to Caroline and Salomon Aaron Nathan. He studied medicine at the University of Kiel, receiving his M.D. in 1830. He took part in the Polish campaign, and afterward settled in Hamburg as a physician.

In addition to his literary activity in medical science, he devoted himself to Jewish learning. Under the pseudonym "Dr. Essenna" he translated Joseph Salvador's Histoire des institutions de Moïse et du peuple hébreu into German, with an introduction by Gabriel Riesser. Under the same pseudonym he published Gedanken aus dem Tagebuche eines Juden über die Drei Grossen Propheten der Europäischen Geschichte.

Publications

References
 

1807 births
1862 deaths
19th-century German Jews
19th-century German male writers
19th-century German writers
19th-century German physicians
French–German translators
German medical writers
Jewish German writers
Jewish physicians
Jews from Hamburg
People from Eutin
Physicians from Hamburg
University of Kiel alumni